The 2017 Sultan of Selangor Cup was played on 6 May 2017, at Singapore National Stadium in Kallang, Singapore.

Pre-match 
On 22 November 2016, in a press conference at Football Association of Singapore headquarters at Jalan Besar Stadium, Sultan of Selangor Cup's chairman, Tan Sri Abdul Karim Munisar confirms that the next tournament will be held on 6 May at Singapore National Stadium. In the same press conference, he also announced that a new competition for youth under sixteen be introduced.

A special press conference for Sultan of Selangor Cup was held on 17 March in Singapore. During the conference, Tan Sri Abdul Karim announces that the Sultan of Selangor, His Royal Highness Sultan Sharafuddin Idris Shah had chosen PKNS F.C. to be Selangor's representative to the competition. The new trophy for the under sixteen competition was also introduced in the ceremony.

On 3 April, Sultan Sharafuddin Idris Shah receive sponsorship that amounts to RM1.06 mil from fourteen corporate body for the sixteenth edition of Sultan of Selangor Cup. In the event held at Istana Alam Shah, Klang, the Sultan receives sponsorship from seven GLC and seven private companies.

Match 

Source:

Players 

Source:

Other matches 
Source:

Veterans

School Challenge

See also 
Singapore Selection XI

References 

Sultan of Selangor Cup